Ferić is a surname, an Italianised version of the Croatian Gvozdenica. Notable people with the surname include:

 Đuro Ferić (1739–1820), Croatian poet and Jesuit
 Nikola Ferić (1736–1819), Croatian Catholic bishop
 Mirosław Ferić (1915–1942), Polish World War II flying ace
 Zoran Ferić (born 1961), Croatian writer and columnist

Croatian surnames